Vernon Carlton "Lefty" Haynes (December 17, 1910 – May 28, 1973) was an American football and basketball player and coach.  He served as the head football coach at Louisiana College in 1940 and at The Apprentice School in Newport News, Virginia from 1949 to 1950.  Haynes was also the head basketball coach at Tulane University from 1942 to 1945.  He played college football at Tulane University, where he was a member of the 1931 Tulane Green Wave football team, which played in the 1932 Rose Bowl.

Coaching career
Haynes was the 12th head football coach at The Apprentice School in Newport News, Virginia and he held that position for two seasons, from 1949 until 1950.  His coaching record at Apprentice was 8–8.

References

External links
 

1910 births
1973 deaths
All-Southern college football players
American football ends
American men's basketball players
The Apprentice Builders football coaches
Basketball coaches from Arkansas
Basketball players from Arkansas
High school basketball coaches in Louisiana
High school football coaches in Louisiana
Louisiana Christian Wildcats football coaches
People from Arkansas City, Arkansas
Tulane Green Wave football coaches
Tulane Green Wave football players
Tulane Green Wave men's basketball coaches
Tulane Green Wave men's basketball players